Cape Disappointment State Park (formerly Fort Canby State Park) is a public recreation area on Cape Disappointment, located southwest of Ilwaco, Washington, on the bottom end of Long Beach Peninsula, the northern headlands where the Columbia River meets the Pacific Ocean. The state park's  encompass a diverse landscape of  old-growth forest, freshwater lakes, freshwater and saltwater marshes, and oceanside tidelands. Park sites include Fort Canby, the Lewis and Clark Interpretive Center, North Head Lighthouse, and Cape Disappointment Lighthouse. Cape Disappointment is one of several state parks and sites in Washington and Oregon that are included in Lewis and Clark National Historical Park.

History
Cape Disappointment earned its name when Captain John Meares failed to cross the river bar in 1788. The feat was accomplished in 1792 by American Captain Robert Gray. The Lewis and Clark Expedition arrived at Cape Disappointment in 1805.

In 1862, during the American Civil War, a camp called Post at Cape Disappointment was established and fortifications existed here from that date to protect the northern approaches to the mouth of the Columbia River from possible attacks by Confederate raiders or foreign fleets. It was garrisoned by Company A, U.S. 9th Infantry Regiment and Company A, 8th Regiment California Volunteer Infantry in the District of Oregon. In 1863, its mate Fort Stevens was established on the south bank of the Columbia River. In 1864, the post was renamed Fort Cape Disappointment. Some Civil War-era fortifications still exist: the Tower (or Right) Battery, Left Battery, and Center Battery.

Fort Cape Disappointment was expanded and renamed Fort Canby in 1875. By 1906, when construction finished under the Endicott program, Fort Canby became part of the three-fort Harbor Defenses of the Columbia River as a subpost of Fort Stevens along with Fort Columbia. The fort was further expanded during World War II. After being decommissioned in the years following World War II, the fort was turned over to the state for use as a state park in the early 1950s. Workers with the Civilian Conservation Corps helped restore the fort and improved roads and trails during the 1930s.

Facilities

The Lewis and Clark Interpretive Center sits on a cliff that overlooks the confluence of the Columbia River and the Pacific Ocean. There are exhibits about the 1803–1806 Lewis and Clark Expedition from St. Louis, Missouri to the Pacific coast, the park's later history, including the lighthouses, U.S. Coast Guard and military activities, and the area's maritime and natural history.

Activities and amenities
Cape Disappointment State Park offers camping and other overnight accommodations,  of hiking trails, stands of old-growth Sitka spruce, watercraft launch sites, picnicking facilities, and tours of the North Head Lighthouse.

Many of the WWII-era military facilities still exist in a ruined state throughout the park and are accessible to the public.

Cape Disappointment State Park’s camping facilities include standard campsites, full hookup RV sites, yurts, cabins, and historic vacation homes.   Camp facilities include full-service restrooms with showers and a park store nearby for groceries, wood, and a café.

References

External links

Cape Disappointment State Park Washington State Parks and Recreation Commission 
Cape Disappointment State Park Map Washington State Parks and Recreation Commission

State parks of Washington (state)
Parks in Pacific County, Washington
Columbia River
Lewis and Clark Expedition
Museums in Pacific County, Washington
History museums in Washington (state)
Historic house museums in Washington (state)
Military and war museums in Washington (state)
Biographical museums in Washington (state)
Maritime history of Washington (state)
Civilian Conservation Corps in Washington (state)
1862 establishments in Washington Territory
National Register of Historic Places in Pacific County, Washington